The 2018 USA Outdoor Track and Field Championships were held at Drake Stadium on the campus of Drake University in Des Moines, Iowa. Organized by USA Track & Field, the four-day competition took place June 21–24 and serves as the national championships in track and field for the United States.

The 50 kilometers race walk was held January 20 at Santee, California.

Schedule

Men's results
Key:
.

Men track events

Men field events

Men's Notes

Women's results
Key:

Women track events

Women field events

Women's Notes

Masters exhibition events

Qualification
The 2018 USA Outdoor Track and Field Championships serve as the qualification meet for United States representatives in international competitions, including the 2018 NACAC Championships. In order to be entered, athletes need to achieve a qualifying standard mark and place in the top 3 in their event. The United States team, as managed by USATF, can also bring a qualified back up athlete in case one of the team members is unable to perform.

Additionally, defending World Champions and 2017 Diamond League Champions received byes into the World Championships. The athletes eligible for a bye are:

Defending World Champions
 Christian Taylor - Triple jump
 Justin Gatlin - 100 m
 Sam Kendricks - Pole Vault
 Phyllis Francis - 400 meters
 Tori Bowie - 100 meters
 Kori Carter - 400 meters hurdles
 Emma Coburn - 3000 m steeplechase
 Brittney Reese - long jump

Diamond League Champions
 Sam Kendricks - Pole Vault
 Christian Taylor - Triple jump (Does not displace; already World Champion)
 Darrell Hill - Shot Put
 Dalilah Muhammad - 400 meters hurdles
 Noah Lyles - 200 meters

Both qualified by winning their respective events in the championships.

References

Results
USATF Championships - 6/21/2018 to 6/24/2018 Drake Stadium, Des Moines Temporary Results. USATF.
2018 USA Outdoor Track and Field Championships Results usatf.org

USA Outdoor Track and Field Championships
USA Outdoors
Track, Outdoor
Sports in Des Moines, Iowa
USA Outdoor Track and Field Championships
Track and field in Iowa